In chemistry, a hydrogen bond (or H-bond) is a primarily electrostatic force of attraction between a hydrogen (H) atom which is covalently bound to a more electronegative "donor" atom or group (Dn), and another electronegative atom bearing a lone pair of electrons—the hydrogen bond acceptor (Ac). Such an interacting system is generally denoted , where the solid line denotes a polar covalent bond, and the dotted or dashed line indicates the hydrogen bond. The most frequent donor and acceptor atoms are the second-row elements nitrogen (N), oxygen (O), and fluorine (F).

Hydrogen bonds can be intermolecular (occurring between separate molecules) or intramolecular (occurring among parts of the same molecule). The energy of a hydrogen bond depends on the geometry, the environment, and the nature of the specific donor and acceptor atoms and can vary between 1 and 40 kcal/mol. This makes them somewhat stronger than a van der Waals interaction, and weaker than fully covalent or ionic bonds. This type of bond can occur in inorganic molecules such as water and in organic molecules like DNA and proteins. Hydrogen bonds are responsible for holding materials such as paper and felted wool together, and for causing separate sheets of paper to stick together after becoming wet and subsequently drying.

The hydrogen bond is responsible for many of the physical and chemical properties of compounds of N, O, and F that seem unusual compared with other similar structures. In particular, intermolecular hydrogen bonding is responsible for the high boiling point of water (100 °C) compared to the other group-16 hydrides that have much weaker hydrogen bonds. Intramolecular hydrogen bonding is partly responsible for the secondary and tertiary structures of proteins and nucleic acids. It also plays an important role in the structure of polymers, both synthetic and natural.

Bonding

Definitions and general characteristics
In a hydrogen bond, the electronegative atom not covalently attached to the hydrogen is named the proton acceptor, whereas the one covalently bound to the hydrogen is named the proton donor. While this nomenclature is recommended by the IUPAC, in the hydrogen bond donor, the H center is protic. The donor is a Lewis base. Hydrogen bonds are represented as  system, where the dots represent the hydrogen bond. Liquids that display hydrogen bonding (such as water) are called associated liquids.

Hydrogen bonds arise from a combination of electrostatics (multipole-multipole and multipole-induced multipole interactions), covalency (charge transfer by orbital overlap), and dispersion (London forces).

In weaker hydrogen bonds, hydrogen atoms tend to bond to elements such as sulfur (S) or chlorine (Cl); even carbon (C) can serve as a donor, particularly when the carbon or one of its neighbors is electronegative (e.g., in chloroform, aldehydes and terminal acetylenes). Gradually, it was recognized that there are many examples of weaker hydrogen bonding involving donor other than N, O, or F and/or acceptor Ac with electronegativity approaching that of hydrogen (rather than being much more electronegative). Although weak (≈1 kcal/mol), "non-traditional" hydrogen bonding interactions are ubiquitous and influence structures of many kinds of materials.

The definition of hydrogen bonding has gradually broadened over time to include these weaker attractive interactions. In 2011, an IUPAC Task Group recommended a modern evidence-based definition of hydrogen bonding, which was published in the IUPAC journal Pure and Applied Chemistry. This definition specifies:

Bond strength
Hydrogen bonds can vary in strength from weak (1–2 kJ/mol) to strong (161.5 kJ/mol in the bifluoride ion). Typical enthalpies in vapor include:
   (161.5 kJ/mol or 38.6 kcal/mol), illustrated uniquely by 
   (29 kJ/mol or 6.9 kcal/mol), illustrated water-ammonia
   (21 kJ/mol or 5.0 kcal/mol), illustrated water-water, alcohol-alcohol
   (13 kJ/mol or 3.1 kcal/mol), illustrated by ammonia-ammonia
   (8 kJ/mol or 1.9 kcal/mol), illustrated water-amide
   (18 kJ/mol or 4.3 kcal/mol)
The strength of intermolecular hydrogen bonds is most often evaluated by measurements of equilibria between molecules containing donor and/or acceptor units, most often in solution. The strength of intramolecular hydrogen bonds can be studied with equilibria between conformers with and without hydrogen bonds. The most important method for the identification of hydrogen bonds also in complicated molecules is crystallography, sometimes also NMR-spectroscopy. Structural details, in particular distances between donor and acceptor which are smaller than the sum of the van der Waals radii can be taken as indication of the hydrogen bond strength.

One scheme gives the following somewhat arbitrary classification: those that are 15 to 40 kcal/mol, 5 to 15 kcal/mol, and >0 to 5 kcal/mol are considered strong, moderate, and weak, respectively.

Resonance assisted hydrogen bond
The resonance assisted hydrogen bond (commonly abbreviated as RAHB) is a strong type of hydrogen bond. It is characterized by the π-delocalization that involves the hydrogen and cannot be properly described by the electrostatic model alone.

Structural details
The  distance is typically ≈110 pm, whereas the  distance is ≈160 to 200 pm. The typical length of a hydrogen bond in water is 197 pm. The ideal bond angle depends on the nature of the hydrogen bond donor. The following hydrogen bond angles between a hydrofluoric acid donor and various acceptors have been determined experimentally:

Spectroscopy
Strong hydrogen bonds are revealed by downfield shifts in the 1H NMR spectrum. For example, the acidic proton in the enol tautomer of acetylacetone appears at  15.5, which is about 10 ppm downfield of a conventional alcohol.

In the IR spectrum, hydrogen bonding shifts the  stretching frequency to lower energy (i.e. the vibration frequency decreases). This shift reflects a weakening of the  bond. Certain hydrogen bonds - improper hydrogen bonds - show a blue shift of the  stretching frequency and a decrease in the bond length. H-bonds can also be measured by IR vibrational mode shifts of the acceptor. The amide I mode of backbone carbonyls in α-helices shifts to lower frequencies when they form H-bonds with side-chain hydroxyl groups. The dynamics of hydrogen bond structures in water can be probed by this OH stretching vibration. In the hydrogen bonding network in protic organic ionic plastic crystals (POIPCs), which are a type of phase change material exhibiting solid-solid phase transitions prior to melting, variable-temperature infrared spectroscopy can reveal the temperature dependence of hydrogen bonds and the dynamics of both the anions and the cations. The sudden weakening of hydrogen bonds during the solid-solid phase transition seems to be coupled with the onset of orientational or rotational disorder of the ions.

Theoretical considerations
Hydrogen bonding is of persistent theoretical interest. According to a modern description  integrates both the intermolecular O:H lone pair ":" nonbond and the intramolecular  polar-covalent bond associated with  repulsive coupling.

Quantum chemical calculations of the relevant interresidue potential constants (compliance constants) revealed large differences between individual H bonds of the same type. For example, the central interresidue  hydrogen bond between guanine and cytosine is much stronger in comparison to the  bond between the adenine-thymine pair.

Theoretically, the bond strength of the hydrogen bonds can be assessed using NCI index, non-covalent interactions index, which allows a visualization of these non-covalent interactions, as its name indicates, using the electron density of the system.

From interpretations of the anisotropies in the Compton profile of ordinary ice that the hydrogen bond is partly covalent. However, this interpretation was challenged.

Most generally, the hydrogen bond can be viewed as a metric-dependent electrostatic scalar field between two or more intermolecular bonds. This is slightly different from the intramolecular bound states of, for example, covalent or ionic bonds; however, hydrogen bonding is generally still a bound state phenomenon, since the interaction energy has a net negative sum. The initial theory of hydrogen bonding proposed by Linus Pauling suggested that the hydrogen bonds had a partial covalent nature. This interpretation remained controversial until NMR techniques demonstrated information transfer between hydrogen-bonded nuclei, a feat that would only be possible if the hydrogen bond contained some covalent character.

History
The concept of hydrogen bonding once was challenging. Linus Pauling credits T. S. Moore and T. F. Winmill with the first mention of the hydrogen bond, in 1912. Moore and Winmill used the hydrogen bond to account for the fact that trimethylammonium hydroxide is a weaker base than tetramethylammonium hydroxide. The description of hydrogen bonding in its better-known setting, water, came some years later, in 1920, from Latimer and Rodebush. In that paper, Latimer and Rodebush cite work by a fellow scientist at their laboratory, Maurice Loyal Huggins, saying, "Mr. Huggins of this laboratory in some work as yet unpublished, has used the idea of a hydrogen kernel held between two atoms as a theory in regard to certain organic compounds."

Hydrogen bonds in small molecules

Water
A ubiquitous example of a hydrogen bond is found between water molecules. In a discrete water molecule, there are two hydrogen atoms and one oxygen atom.  The simplest case is a pair of water molecules with one hydrogen bond between them, which is called the water dimer and is often used as a model system. When more molecules are present, as is the case with liquid water, more bonds are possible because the oxygen of one water molecule has two lone pairs of electrons, each of which can form a hydrogen bond with a hydrogen on another water molecule. This can repeat such that every water molecule is H-bonded with up to four other molecules, as shown in the figure (two through its two lone pairs, and two through its two hydrogen atoms). Hydrogen bonding strongly affects the crystal structure of ice, helping to create an open hexagonal lattice. The density of ice is less than the density of water at the same temperature; thus, the solid phase of water floats on the liquid, unlike most other substances.

Liquid water's high boiling point is due to the high number of hydrogen bonds each molecule can form, relative to its low molecular mass. Owing to the difficulty of breaking these bonds, water has a very high boiling point, melting point, and viscosity compared to otherwise similar liquids not conjoined by hydrogen bonds. Water is unique because its oxygen atom has two lone pairs and two hydrogen atoms, meaning that the total number of bonds of a water molecule is up to four.

The number of hydrogen bonds formed by a molecule of liquid water fluctuates with time and temperature.   From TIP4P liquid water simulations at 25 °C, it was estimated that each water molecule participates in an average of 3.59 hydrogen bonds. At 100 °C, this number decreases to 3.24 due to the increased molecular motion and decreased density, while at 0 °C, the average number of hydrogen bonds increases to 3.69. Another study found a much smaller number of hydrogen bonds: 2.357 at 25 °C. Defining and counting the hydrogen bonds is not straightforward however.

Because water may form hydrogen bonds with solute proton donors and acceptors, it may competitively inhibit the formation of solute intermolecular or intramolecular hydrogen bonds. Consequently, hydrogen bonds between or within solute molecules dissolved in water are almost always unfavorable relative to hydrogen bonds between water and the donors and acceptors for hydrogen bonds on those solutes. Hydrogen bonds between water molecules have an average lifetime of 10−11 seconds, or 10 picoseconds.

Bifurcated and over-coordinated hydrogen bonds in water 
A single hydrogen atom can participate in two hydrogen bonds, rather than one. This type of bonding is called "bifurcated" (split in two or "two-forked"). It can exist, for instance, in complex natural or synthetic organic molecules. It has been suggested that a bifurcated hydrogen atom is an essential step in water reorientation.
Acceptor-type hydrogen bonds (terminating on an oxygen's lone pairs) are more likely to form bifurcation (it is called overcoordinated oxygen, OCO) than are donor-type hydrogen bonds, beginning on the same oxygen's hydrogens.

Other liquids
For example, hydrogen fluoride—which has three lone pairs on the F atom but only one H atom—can form only two bonds; (ammonia has the opposite problem: three hydrogen atoms but only one lone pair).

H-F***H-F***H-F

Further manifestations of solvent hydrogen bonding
 Increase in the melting point, boiling point, solubility, and viscosity of many compounds can be explained by the concept of hydrogen bonding.
 Negative azeotropy of mixtures of HF and water.
 The fact that ice is less dense than liquid water is due to a crystal structure stabilized by hydrogen bonds.
 Viscosity of anhydrous phosphoric acid and of glycerol.
 Dimer formation in carboxylic acids and hexamer formation in hydrogen fluoride, which occur even in the gas phase, resulting in gross deviations from the ideal gas law.
 Pentamer formation of water and alcohols in apolar solvents.

Hydrogen bonds in polymers
Hydrogen bonding plays an important role in determining the three-dimensional structures and the properties adopted by many synthetic and natural proteins. Thus, hydrogen bonds can be broken by chemical or mechanical means while retaining the basic structure of the polymer backbone. This hierarchy of bond strengths (covalent bonds being stronger than hydrogen-bonds being stronger than van der Waals forces) is relevant in the properties of many materials.

DNA

In these macromolecules, bonding between parts of the same macromolecule cause it to fold into a specific shape, which helps determine the molecule's physiological or biochemical role. For example, the double helical structure of DNA is due largely to hydrogen bonding between its base pairs (as well as pi stacking interactions), which link one complementary strand to the other and enable replication.

Proteins
In the secondary structure of proteins, hydrogen bonds form between the backbone oxygens and amide hydrogens. When two strands are joined by hydrogen bonds involving alternating residues on each participating strand, a beta sheet is formed. Hydrogen bonds also play a part in forming the tertiary structure of protein through interaction of R-groups. (See also protein folding).

Bifurcated H-bond systems are common in alpha-helical transmembrane proteins between the backbone amide  of residue i as the H-bond acceptor and two H-bond donors from residue : the backbone amide  and a side-chain hydroxyl or thiol . The energy preference of the bifurcated H-bond hydroxyl or thiol system is -3.4 kcal/mol or -2.6 kcal/mol, respectively. This type of bifurcated H-bond provides an intrahelical H-bonding partner for polar side-chains, such as serine, threonine, and cysteine within the hydrophobic membrane environments.

The role of hydrogen bonds in protein folding has also been linked to osmolyte-induced protein stabilization. Protective osmolytes, such as trehalose and sorbitol, shift the protein folding equilibrium toward the folded state, in a concentration dependent manner. While the prevalent explanation for osmolyte action relies on excluded volume effects that are entropic in nature, circular dichroism (CD) experiments have shown osmolyte to act through an enthalpic effect. The molecular mechanism for their role in protein stabilization is still not well established, though several mechanisms have been proposed. Computer molecular dynamics simulations suggest that osmolytes stabilize proteins by modifying the hydrogen bonds in the protein hydration layer.

Several studies have shown that hydrogen bonds play an important role for the stability between subunits in multimeric proteins. For example, a study of sorbitol dehydrogenase displayed an important hydrogen bonding network which stabilizes the tetrameric quaternary structure within the mammalian sorbitol dehydrogenase protein family.

A protein backbone hydrogen bond incompletely shielded from water attack is a dehydron. Dehydrons promote the removal of water through proteins or ligand binding. The exogenous dehydration enhances the electrostatic interaction between the amide and carbonyl groups by de-shielding their partial charges. Furthermore, the dehydration stabilizes the hydrogen bond by destabilizing the nonbonded state consisting of dehydrated isolated charges.

Wool, being a protein fibre, is held together by hydrogen bonds, causing wool to recoil when stretched. However, washing at high temperatures can permanently break the hydrogen bonds and a garment may permanently lose its shape.

Cellulose
Hydrogen bonds are important in the structure of cellulose and derived fibers, such as cotton and flax.

Synthetic polymers
The properties of many synthetic polymers are affected by hydrogen bonds within and/or between the chains. In nylon, hydrogen bonds exist between carbonyl and amine groups in the amide repeat unit. They effectively link adjacent chains, which reinforce the material. Hydrogen bonds also affect the aramid fibre, where hydrogen bonds stabilize the linear chains laterally. The chain axes are aligned along the fibre axis, making the fibres extremely stiff and strong. Hydrogen-bond networks make both natural and synthetic polymers sensitive to humidity levels in the atmosphere because water molecules can diffuse into the surface and disrupt the network. Some polymers are more sensitive than others. Thus nylons are more sensitive than aramids, and nylon 6 more sensitive than nylon-11.

Symmetric hydrogen bond
A symmetric hydrogen bond is a special type of hydrogen bond in which the proton is spaced exactly halfway between two identical atoms. The strength of the bond to each of those atoms is equal. It is an example of a three-center four-electron bond. This type of bond is much stronger than a "normal" hydrogen bond. The effective bond order is 0.5, so its strength is comparable to a covalent bond. It is seen in ice at high pressure, and also in the solid phase of many anhydrous acids such as hydrofluoric acid and formic acid at high pressure. It is also seen in the bifluoride ion . Due to severe steric constraint, the protonated form of Proton Sponge (1,8-bis(dimethylamino)naphthalene) and its derivatives also have symmetric hydrogen bonds, although in the case of protonated Proton Sponge, the assembly is bent.

Dihydrogen bond
The hydrogen bond can be compared with the closely related dihydrogen bond, which is also an intermolecular bonding interaction involving hydrogen atoms. These structures have been known for some time, and well characterized by crystallography; however, an understanding of their relationship to the conventional hydrogen bond, ionic bond, and covalent bond remains unclear. Generally, the hydrogen bond is characterized by a proton acceptor that is a lone pair of electrons in nonmetallic atoms (most notably in the nitrogen, and chalcogen groups). In some cases, these proton acceptors may be pi-bonds or metal complexes. In the dihydrogen bond, however, a metal hydride serves as a proton acceptor, thus forming a hydrogen-hydrogen interaction. Neutron diffraction has shown that the molecular geometry of these complexes is similar to hydrogen bonds, in that the bond length is very adaptable to the metal complex/hydrogen donor system.

Application to drugs
Hydrogen bonding is a relevant to drug design. According to Lipinski's rule of five the majority of orally active drugs have no more than five hydrogen bond donors and fewer than ten hydrogen bond acceptors. These interactions exist between nitrogen–hydrogen and oxygen–hydrogen centers. Many drugs do not, however, obey these "rules".

References

Further reading
 George A. Jeffrey. An Introduction to Hydrogen Bonding (Topics in Physical Chemistry). Oxford University Press, USA (March 13, 1997).

External links
 The Bubble Wall (Audio slideshow from the National High Magnetic Field Laboratory explaining cohesion, surface tension and hydrogen bonds)
 isotopic effect on bond dynamics

Chemical bonding
Hydrogen physics
Supramolecular chemistry
Intermolecular forces